The Farmer Takes a Wife is a 1935 American comedy film directed by Victor Fleming, written by Edwin J. Burke, and starring Janet Gaynor, Henry Fonda (in his screen debut) and Charles Bickford. It is based on the 1934 Broadway play The Farmer Takes a Wife by Marc Connelly and Frank B. Elser, with Fonda reprising his stage role as the farmer. The film was released on August 2, 1935, by 20th Century-Fox.

Plot
Dan Harrow goes to work as a driver for Samson Weaver on the Erie Canal, but his heart is set on buying a farm and settling down, even though his father was a canal man. This ambition and his distaste for fighting puzzle Molly Larkins, the girlfriend and cook of Jotham Klore, but she develops a liking for him anyway.

When Samson wins $5000 in a lottery, he gives Dan a half share of his boat. This prompts Dan to propose to Molly, but she wants to stay on the Erie Canal, not live on a farm, so she will only go work for him, much to Jotham's displeasure.  Jotham arrives at a big fair at the same time as Molly and Dan. Samson warns Dan, so he asks Molly to leave for Utica. Molly is ashamed of him, thinking he is a coward, but he confesses that he is going to Utica to finalize the purchase of a farm. Molly is so disgusted by this news that she quarrels with him. He departs for his new farm, leaving his share of the boat to Molly and warning her that the Erie Canal's days of prosperity are numbered, as the railroads move in.

Molly is miserable, but refuses to admit it. She tells her friend Fortune Friendly that she might have gotten used to the idea of being a farmer's wife, but she could never marry a coward. Fortune decides to take matters into his own hands. He goes to see Dan. He lies and tells Dan that Molly is being shunned and insulted for having worked for a coward. Dan decides to have it out with Jotham. Molly then tries to prevent the fight, but without success. When Dan manages to beat Jotham, Molly tells him he is the new champion of the Canal and that he should stay, but he finally gives up on her.  He tells that he no longer wants her and heads home. However, she follows him to his place, and he embraces her.

Cast 
Janet Gaynor as Molly Larkins
Henry Fonda as Dan Harrow
Charles Bickford as Jotham Klore
Slim Summerville as Fortune Friendly
Andy Devine as Elmer Otway
Roger Imhof as Samson 'Sam' Weaver
Jane Withers as Della
Margaret Hamilton as Lucy Gurget
Sig Ruman as Blacksmith
John Qualen as Sol Tinker 
Kitty Kelly as Ivy
Robert Gleckler as Fisher
Erville Alderson as Wagon Father (uncredited) 
Philip Cooper as John Wilkes Booth (uncredited)
George 'Gabby' Hayes as Lucas (uncredited) 
J.M. Kerrigan as Angus (uncredited) 
Mitchell Lewis as Boatman in Office (uncredited)  
Robert Warwick as Junius Brutus Booth (uncredited)

Reception
Andre Sennwald, critic for The New York Times, called The Farmer Takes a Wife "a rich and leisurely comedy of American manners" and singled out the performances of Fonda and Bickford for praise. However, while he wrote that Summerville and Gaynor gave "pleasant performances", he felt that "Miss Gaynor is really too nice a person to be playing bad girls like Molly Larkins."

References

External links
 
 

1935 films
1935 romantic comedy films
American black-and-white films
American romantic comedy films
1930s English-language films
American films based on plays
Films directed by Victor Fleming
Films set in New York (state)
Films shot in Allentown, Pennsylvania
20th Century Fox films
Fox Film films
1930s American films
Silent romantic comedy films